The UTK Agriculture Farm Mound site is an archaeological site on the agriculture campus of the University of Tennessee in Knoxville, Tennessee. The site is a burial mound made by people of the Woodland period, and has been dated as early as ca. 644 AD. Today, the site is a landmark on the UTK campus and is listed in the National Register for Historic Places.

Location

The site is located at the Agricultural Campus at the corner of Joe Johnson Drive and Chapman Drive.  In 2011, a garden was built around the site to protect it from "construction damage"  and attract interest and attention to the mound. The design of the garden was developed by Hendrik van de Werken and Don Williams, professors of Ornamental Horticulture and Landscape Design at UT, and was revised by Sam Rogers, who is an associate professor in the Department of Plant Sciences. The president of the Tennessee Chapter of Gamma Sigma Delta (The Honor Society of Agriculture), Fred Allen, proposed the project to the UT Chapter in 2008 "as a long term service project to enhance the educational opportunities and aesthetic beauty of the site". Project directors enlisted the help of the Eastern Cherokee tribe and Tribal Historic Preservation. Principal Chief Michell Hicks attended the ribbon-cutting ceremony, and elder Mertyl Driver blessed the site.

According to the UT Institute of Agriculture, "The goal of the project is to honor the Native American tradition dating back to 644 A.D. when the Woodland People used burial mounds as a way of burying and honoring their deceased." The mound is considered a valuable piece of the UT Gardens.

See also

Mound builder (people)
Earthwork (archaeology)

Notes

References

 “Activities and Projects: Indian Mound Adopt-a-Spot”, Gamma Sigma Delta, Retrieved November 18, 2012
 Fielder, George F., Archaeological Survey with Emphasis on Prehistoric Sites of The Oak Ridge Reservation Oak Ridge , Tennessee, Oak Ridge National Laboratory Research Library, Retrieved November 18, 2012
 Media Advisory, University of Tennessee Institute of Agriculture, June 13, 2011
 “Preservation of Works: Mayor’s Task Force on Historic Preservation”, City of Knoxville, Retrieved November 18, 2012
 “Ribbon Cutting held at UT’s Native American Mound Garden”, Cherokee One Feather, June 22, 2011 
 “UT and Cherokee Officials Dedicate Native American Interpretive Garden on Agriculture Campus”, University of Tennessee Institute of Agriculture, June 23, 2011

External links
 National Register of Historic Places - Agriculture Farm Mound

Mounds in Tennessee
Native American history of Tennessee
Culture of Knoxville, Tennessee
Archaeological sites on the National Register of Historic Places in Tennessee
National Register of Historic Places in Knoxville, Tennessee